The Divide is a 2021 French drama film directed by Catherine Corsini. In June 2021, the film was selected to compete for the Palme d'Or at the 2021 Cannes Film Festival. At Cannes, it won the Queer Palm.

The film centres on Raf and Julie, a couple who find themselves in a hospital, having nearly suffocated, on the night before a major demonstration.

Synopsis
During a winter evening in 2018, Raf, on the verge of breaking up with Julie, fractures an elbow and ends up in the emergency department of a large Parisian hospital. At the same time, Yann arrives injured from the clash with the riot police at a large demonstration of yellow vests. The encounter between these three characters shatters their certainties and prejudices, while outside the tension intensifies and the hospital has to close its doors for the protestors who besiege the building and the staff are overwhelmed.

Cast
 Valeria Bruni Tedeschi as Raf
 Marina Foïs as Julie
 Pio Marmaï as Yann
 Jean-Louis Coulloc'h
 Aïssatou Diallo Sagna

Production
The role of Raf represents Catherine Corsini a lot, who fell breaking her elbow and finding herself in the emergency room on 1 December 2018, the day of the First Act of the Yellow Vests [sic]. In September 2020, it was announced Valeria Bruni Tedeschi, Marina Foïs, Pio Marmaï, Jean-Louis Coulloc'h and Aïssatou Diallo Sagna had joined the cast of the film. Catherine Corsini wrote the script alongside Agnès Feuvre, with Laurette Polmanss collaborating. Filming began on 23 September 2020 and was scheduled to place over seven weeks in the Paris region and in Lyon.

Release
The film premièred at the Cannes Film Festival on 9 July 2021. It was first theatrically released in France on 27 October 2021.

Reception

Box office
The Divide grossed $0 in the United States and Canada, and a worldwide total of $2.2 million, against a production budget of about $4.8 million.

Critical response
On review aggregator Rotten Tomatoes, the film holds an approval rating of 72% based on 18 reviews, with an average rating of 6/10. On Metacritic, the film holds a score of 61 out of 100, based on 8 critics, indicating "generally favorable reviews".

References

External links
 

2021 films
2021 drama films
2021 LGBT-related films
2020s French-language films
French drama films
French LGBT-related films
Films directed by Catherine Corsini
LGBT-related drama films
Lesbian-related films
Queer Palm winners
2020s French films